Nicolaus Davis (or Nikolaus Davis ; 1 January 1883 – 4 August 1967) was a Greek genre and landscape painter.

Biography 
He was born in Amorgos as the son of a merchant. His parents moved to Athens where he visited the School of Arts as a guest lecturer. In 1908 with a scholarship he went to Munich and studied at the Academy of Fine Arts Munich. His teachers there were Carl von Marr and Ludwig von Löfftz. Davis became member of the Muich Artist Union (Münchner Künstlergenossenschaft) and participated at the international Glaspalast exhibitions in 1918, 1919, 1922 and 1925. His studio was in Schwabing.

Nicolaus Davis died in Ebersberg (near Munich) in 1967.

Works 
His still life paintings were more commonly made into post cards compared to his other works.

Among his works are:

 Two masted bargue in full sail
 Lake Chiemsee (formerly Heinrich Hausmann Collection)

External links 
 http://matrikel.adbk.de/05ordner/mb_1884-1920/jahr_1908/matrikel-03591 Matrikeleintrag an der AdBK München

Literature 
 Dresslers Kunsthandbuch, Band II, Berlin 1930, S.169
 Künstlerlexikon Vollmer, Band I., 1953,  S.625
 Münchner Maler im 19./20. Jahrhundert, Band 5 Achmann-Kursell, 1993

References

1883 births
1967 deaths
Academy of Fine Arts, Munich alumni
20th-century Greek painters
Munich School
People from Amorgos